For the Working Girl is the title of the ninth album release by singer-songwriter Melissa Manchester released by Arista Records.

Recorded at Northstar Studios in Boulder, Colorado in the summer of 1980, For the Working Girl reteamed Manchester with Steve Buckingham, producer of the title cut of the singer's 1979 self-titled album release; as with the Melissa Manchester album, the track listing of For the Working Girl balanced Manchester originals (totaling five) with outside material (totaling six).

Released in September 1980, For the Working Girl received heavy promotion emphasizing Manchester's new streamlined image, the album's cover photograph being taken by glamor shot specialist George Hurrell. Also stressed in the album promotion was the album's title cut, Manchester's collaboration with Bernie Taupin famed as regular lyricist for Elton John during the first phase of the latter's career: Manchester and Taupin had met through having the same manager, and their musical collaboration "For the Working Girl" was touted as a feminist anthem in the tradition of Helen Reddy's "I Am Woman". It was announced in November 1980 that Pistol Productions, owned by Taupin and Michael Lippman, would produce a feature film entitled Working Girl based on the title cut of Manchester's current album with the singer in a starring role. However Manchester's acting career would prove to be occasional with her only starring roles onstage, her onscreen feature film credit being a small role in For the Boys (1991) as a backup singer to the lead character played by Bette Midler (Manchester had begun her performing career as a member of Midler's Harlettes backing group).

Despite the promo emphasis on the album's title cut, the choice for lead single fell to "If This Is Love" an easy listening ballad which charted on Billboards A/C chart (#19) but failed to reach the Hot 100 stalling at #102. The album's second single release - in February 1981 - was "Lovers After All", a duet with Peabo Bryson, the first A-side release written by Manchester since the non-charting "Be Somebody" in early 1977. Written with Leon Ware, "Lovers After All" reached three Billboard charts - the Hot 100 (at #54), R&B chart (#35) and A/C (#25) without sufficient impact to be considered a comeback for Manchester. A third single: a remake of the 1972 #1 hit by Nilsson: "Without You", failed to chart.

Without the impetus of a major hit single, For the Working Girl maintained Manchester as a moderate presence on the Billboard album chart peaking at #68.

The personnel on For the Working Girl includes the singer's father David Manchester on bassoon.

Track listing
 "If This Is Love" (Kerry Chater, Robbie Patton) - 3:39
 "Any Kind of Fool" (Don Stalker, Steve Berg, Steve Dorff) - 3:07
 "(For the) Working Girl" (Bernie Taupin, Melissa Manchester) - 4:13
 "Without You" (Pete Ham, Thomas Evans) - 3:26
 "Boys in the Backroom" (Manchester) - 3:35
 "You and Me" (Carole Bayer Sager, Peter Allen) - 3:52
 "Talk" (Manchester, Allee Willis) - 3:46
 "A Fool's Affair" – 3:41 (Richard Kerr, Troy Seals) - 3:41
 "Lovers After All" (Manchester, Leon Ware); Duet with Peabo Bryson
 "Tears of Joy" (Manchester, Alan and Marilyn Bergman) - 3:55
 "Happier Than I've Ever Been" (Manchester) - 3:29

Personnel
 Melissa Manchester – lead vocals 
 Randy McCormick – keyboards, rhythm arrangements
 Alan Feingold – synthesizers
 Larry Byrom – guitar 
 Steve Buckingham – guitar, rhythm arrangements
 Tom Robb – bass
 James Stroud – drums, percussion 
 Tommy Cooper – glockenspiel 
 Avtar Singh Khalsa – marimba, vibraphone 
 Beth Cooper – French horn
 David Manchester – bassoon 
 Barry Fasman – horn and string arrangements (1-9)
 Steve Cagen – horn and string arrangements (10, 11)
 Sid Sharp – concertmaster 
 Patti Allinson – backing vocals 
 Steve Carlisle – backing vocals
 Charles Chalmers – backing vocals
 Paul Davis – backing vocals 
 Don Henley – backing vocals 
 Kathleen Jackson – backing vocals
 Bernadine Mitchell – backing vocals
 Donna Rhodes – backing vocals
  Sandra Rhodes – backing vocals
 Ed Seay – backing vocals
 Peabo Bryson – lead vocals (9)

Production
 Producer – Steve Buckingham
 Engineers – Larry Roberts and Ed Seay
 Assistant Engineers – Russell Bracher, Tommy Cooper and Julian Stoll.
 Recorded at Northstar Studios (Boulder, CO); Web IV Studios (Atlanta, GA); Britannia Studios (Hollywood, CA).
 Mixed by Ed Seay at Web IV Studios (Atlanta, GA).
 Mastered by Glenn Meadows at Masterfonics (Nashville, TN).
 Photography – George Hurrell

References

1980 albums
Melissa Manchester albums
albums produced by Steve Buckingham (record producer)
Arista Records albums